The 1986–87 season was Clydebank's twenty-first season in the Scottish Football League. They competed in the Scottish Premier Division for the third time and the second in a row. They finished 11th in the 12 team division and relegated to the First Division. They also competed in the Scottish League Cup and Scottish Cup which they made the Quarter-finals.

Results

Premier Division

Final League table

Scottish League Cup

Scottish Cup

References

 

Clydebank
Clydebank F.C. (1965) seasons